Tyssedal is a village in Ullensvang municipality in Vestland county, Norway. Tyssedal is located in an environment in a valley between the fjord to the west and the mountains leading up to the Hardangervidda mountain plateau to the east. 

Tyssedal Church is located in this village. The lake Ringedalsvatnet and the Trolltunga cliff are located just to the east, higher up in the valley.

History

Tyssedal is a typical monotown, depending upon the energy received from the hydropower station. The ilmenite smelter "Tinfos Titan and Iron" (TTI) (owned by Tinfos) is located here and is the largest employer in the village. The smelter was converted from making aluminium in the late 1980s. The first hydropower station in Tyssedal, Tysso I is today part of the Norwegian Museum of Hydropower and Industry. Tyssedal grew up around this smelter in the early-twentieth century.

Language

Tyssedal drew migrants from different parts of Norway, all of whom spoke Norwegian with a different dialect.  As a result, there developed a new dialect in Tyssedal, a mixture of that spoken in the home regions of the migrants; a phenomenon termed by linguists "a Koiné language".  Tyssedal and the nearby town of Odda—which arose in the same time and socio-economic circumstances —provided valuable insights to linguists studying this phenomenon.

Professor Paul Kerswill conducted an intensive study of the Norwegian spoken in the two communities, relating them to very different geographical origins: The workers in Odda came predominantly (86%) from western Norway. In Tyssedal only about one third came from western Norway; one third came from eastern Norway; and the rest from other parts of the country. The dialects that evolved in these two communities were radically different from each other, though spoken at a short geographical distance from each other.

See also
Tyssedal Hydroelectric Power Station

References

Related reading
Paul Kerswill (2003) "Koineization and Accommodation" The Handbook of Language Variation and Change (Wiley-Blackwell. Chapter 26) 

Villages in Vestland
Ullensvang
Monotowns in Norway